Arthur Bradfield Fairclough  (25 July 1896 – 9 December 1968) was a Canadian First World War flying ace, officially credited with 19 aerial victories.

Early life and background
Fairclough was born in Toronto, the son of Leonard and Ettie (née Carter) Fairclough, and before the war worked as a clerk for the financiers Wood Gundy.

Military service
On 7 February 1916 Fairclough was commissioned as a lieutenant in the 2nd Regiment, Queen's Own Rifles of Canada. On 24 May he volunteered for overseas service, and was assigned to the 166th Battalion, Canadian Expeditionary Force. He sailed for England on 26 September, and on 6 October was placed on the General List, assigned to the Canadian Machine Gun Corps, and posted to the Canadian Training Depot. After completing his training at the Canadian Machine Gun School on 23 December, he was posted to the Canadian Machine Gun Depot on 31 January 1917.

Fairclough then elected to serve in the Royal Flying Corps. His training began at the No 1 School of Military Aeronautics, in Reading, Berkshire, on 16 February 1917, and he was posted to No. 2 Reserve Squadron on 27 March for basic flight training. He was granted Royal Aero Club Aviators' Certificate No. 4597 on 24 April, and was posted to No. 42 Reserve Squadron on 30 April to complete his training. He was seconded to the Royal Flying Corps on 22 May, and appointed a flying officer the following day. He was posted to No. 49 Squadron, then a training unit, serving as an instructor there from 28 August, and also briefly served in No. 40 and No. 56 Training Squadrons in October and November. Fairclough was sent to France on 15 November, posted to No. 1 Aeroplane Supply Depot at Saint-Omer, then posted to No. 19 Squadron on 18 November to fly the SPAD S.VII single-seat fighter aircraft.

Fairclough gained his first aerial victory in a SPAD on 6 December 1917, scoring steadily throughout the month, and had nine victories to his credit by the end of the year. His squadron converted to the Sopwith Dolphin in January 1918, and he scored five more victories between 17 March and 2 May, by which time the Army's Royal Flying Corps (RFC) and the Royal Naval Air Service (RNAS) had been merged to form the Royal Air Force.

He was awarded the Military Cross, which was gazetted on 10 May 1918. His citation read:
Lt. Arthur Bradfield Fairclough, Can. M.G. Co. and R.F.C.
"For conspicuous gallantry and devotion to duty. During four months he has destroyed four enemy machines, and has driven down two others completely out of control. When engaged with hostile aircraft he has at all times displayed the utmost dash and courage."

Fairclough was transferred to No. 23 Squadron RAF on 4 May and appointed a flight commander with the temporary rank of captain. Between 29 June and 5 July he gained five more victories, to bring his total to nineteen. He was returned to the Home Establishment on 8 July, and was posted to back to Canada on 11 July. On 13 September he was assigned to RAF Canada's School of Special Flying (No. 43 Wing) at Armour Heights, where he was appointed an Examining Officer on 21 October, to train flying instructors.

On 14 April 1919 Lieutenant (Honorary Captain) Fairclough relinquished his Royal Air Force commission on ceasing to be employed. and the following day was struck off the strength of the Canadian Expeditionary Force.

List of aerial victories

References

1896 births
1968 deaths
People from Old Toronto
Canadian Expeditionary Force officers
Royal Flying Corps officers
Royal Air Force personnel of World War I
Canadian World War I flying aces
Canadian recipients of the Military Cross
Military personnel from Toronto
Canadian Machine Gun Corps officers
Queen's Own Rifles of Canada officers
Canadian military personnel of World War I